Ramos is a surname of Spanish and Portuguese origin.

Ramos may also refer to:

 Ramos, Tarlac, a municipality in the Philippines
 Ramos Island, an island in the Solomon Islands
 Ramos, Rio de Janeiro, a subdivision in Rio de Janeiro's north side

See also

Ramo (disambiguation)